Urumbukal Urangarilla is a 2015 Indian Malayalam-language comedy thriller film written and directed by Jiju Asokan. It features Vinay Forrt, Chemban Vinod Jose, Sudheer Karamana, Aju Varghese, Musthafa, Innocent, Ananya, Vanitha Krishnachandran, Janaki Krishnan, Thesni Khan and Kalabhavan Shajon. The film was released on 19 September 2015 to positive reviews from critics.

Plot
The story of the film is based on thieves. A young man named Manoj joins with a theft guru Kelu Ashan, to learn the art. However, Kelu Ashan is old and retired so he introduces him to one of his students Benny to be trained in the art of robbery. Benny trains him well. After Benny was caught, he meets Kelu Ashan again, who teaches him the "Science of Theft". Manoj eventually gets caught. He is sent to jail, where he meets Benny. The pith of the story starts to unravel then. Manoj  was actually in search of a thief, named Carlos who has murdered his parents when he was abroad. His intention to become a thief and to get in to jail (as he learned Carlos was also in Jail, from Kelu Ashan), was with this objective. He finds the thief who has murdered his parents. He then hatches a plan, traps the thief and kills him viciously by slathering sugar solution all over his body and scattering ants. Later the young man starts an old age home and his co-thieves are shown living happily.

Cast
 Vinay Forrt as Vinod /Manoj(fake name)
 Chemban Vinod Jose as Benny
 Innocent as Madhavan Nair
 Sudheer Karamana as Kelu Aasan
 Aju Varghese as Babukuttan
 Musthafa as Balu
 Ananya as Sheela
 Vanitha Krishnachandran as Radha
 Janaki Krishnan as Deepa
 Kalabhavan Shajon as Carlos
 Sreejith Ravi as Choodan Rajappan
 Santhosh Keezhattoor as Davis
 Vettukili Prakash as Bhaskaran
 Thesni Khan as Rosely
 Manju Sunichan as Janamma
 Sasankan Mayyanad
 Lakshmipriya as Anitha (cameo)
 Pradeep Kottayam as Sulu's husband (cameo)

Reception
Sify gave the verdict "above average" and said "Urumbukal Urangarilla may not offer many surprises and may not be that great for a discerning viewer. But even then this one has its moments for sure and ends up as a decent entertainer".

Metromatinee.com wrote "Urumbukal Urangarilla is nicely executed and technically the movie stands on its feet", also added "Urumbukal Urangarilla is a decent enough effort that engages off and on. There is some well worked out humour and if some avoidable glitches weren't there this one would have endeared even better to the audience".

Indiaglitz.com rated 2.5 out of 5 stars and wrote "'Urumbukal Urangarilla' intends to entertain. There are occasions where things go flat and there is a lull in the narrative. Parts of second half were so. But the movie picked up speed towards the climax and overall feel tended towards being impressive".

Nowrunning.com rated 2.5 out of 6 stars and said "Urumbukal Urangarilla is original and creative, and comes across as an appealing cinematic disquisition on a population that apparently never sleeps. It's a quirky , comic film that provides plenty of silly, and yet inventive fun".

Music

The music was scored by Gopi Sunder and tracks were penned by Hari Narayanan.

References

External links

Official Website 
Official facebook Page  

Indian comedy thriller films
Films shot in Palani
Films shot in Pollachi
Films shot in Ottapalam
Films shot in Thrissur
2010s Malayalam-language films